Pseudomonas fuscovaginae is a fluorescent, Gram-negative, soil bacterium that causes brown sheath rot of rice and wheat. The type strain is CCUG 32780.

References

External links
 Type strain of Pseudomonas fuscovaginae at BacDive -  the Bacterial Diversity Metadatabase

Pseudomonadales
Bacterial plant pathogens and diseases
Rice diseases
Bacteria described in 1976